The National Theater was a Yiddish theatre at the southwest corner of Second Avenue (Chrystie) and Houston Street in the Yiddish Theater District in Manhattan, New York City, United States.  When first built it was leased to Boris Thomashefsky and Julius Adler. Its grand opening as the Adler-Thomashefsky National Theatre was on September 24, 1912.

The theatre was one of the many designed by architect Thomas W. Lamb, and seated 1,900 when it opened. It was built as one of a pair of theatres, with the Crown Theater, seating 963, on the upper level. Both theatres closed in 1941, re-opened in 1951 as a pair of cinemas (the National Theater and the Roosevelt Theater), and were demolished in 1959.

References

Yiddish theatre in the United States
Jewish theatres
Jews and Judaism in Manhattan
Demolished theatres in New York City
Demolished buildings and structures in Manhattan
Former theatres in Manhattan
Yiddish culture in New York City
Lower East Side
Thomas W. Lamb buildings
Buildings and structures demolished in 1959